Samuel Keeley may refer to:

 Sam Keeley (born 1991), Irish actor
 Samuel Keeley (footballer) (1874–?), Scottish footballer